Hakake (Uvean for "East") is one of the 5 districts of Wallis and Futuna, located in Wallis Island, in the Pacific Ocean. It is part of the Chiefdom of Uvea.

Geography
Located in the middle of the island, Hahake borders with the districts of Hihifo and Mua. Mata Utu (also spelled Mata-Utu and Matāutu) is the capital of the district, and of the Wallis and Futuna Territory as a whole.

The district is divided into 6 municipal villages:

See also
Alofivai
Talietumu

References

External links

 Map showing the location of Mata Utu
 Picture of the lagoon of Mata Utu (Archived 2009-10-31)

Chiefdoms and districts of Wallis and Futuna